Esporte Clube Tupy, commonly known as Tupy, is a Brazilian football club based in Vila Velha, Espírito Santo state.

History
The club was founded on October 16, 1938, becoming professional in 1988. They won the Campeonato Capixaba Second Level in 2001.

In 2003, Túlio Maravilha was signed to play the Copa Espirito Santo, scoring 3 goals. Temporary bleachers had to be installed on Gil Bernardes stadium to accommodate the increased number of fans who wanted to see him playing.

Achievements
 Campeonato Capixaba Second Level:
 Winners (1): 2001

Stadium
Esporte Clube Tupy play their home games at Estádio Gil Bernardes da Silveira, nicknamed Estádio Toca do Índio. The stadium has a maximum capacity of 2,000 people.

References

Association football clubs established in 1938
Football clubs in Espírito Santo
1938 establishments in Brazil